The 2019 season is Shan United's 10th season in the Myanmar National League since 2009.

Season Review

2019 First team squad

Transfer

Transfer In

Transfer Out

Coaching staff
{|class="wikitable"
|-
!Position
!Staff
|-
|Manager||   Min Thu
|-
|rowspan="2"|Assistant Manager||  Aung Kyaw Myo
|-
| Han Win Aung
|-
|Technical Coach|| 
|-
|Goalkeeper Coach|| Aung Thet
|-
|Fitness Coach|| 
|-

Other information

|-

Competition

Myanmar National League

References

Shan United